Mary Manross is an American politician who served as mayor of Scottsdale, Arizona. First elected in June 2000, she served two terms and lost her campaign for a third term as mayor in the November 2008 runoff mayoral election to her opponent, former Certified Public Accountant and businessman and former city councilman Jim Lane.

Education 
Manross earned a Bachelor of Arts in political science from the University of California at Los Angeles and a teaching credential from Minot State University.

Career 
Before her election as councilwoman, Manross served on several city government commissions and in leadership positions for local charitable organizations, as well as being campaign manager for Mayor Herb Drinkwater's 1984 and 1988 mayoral campaigns.

Manross served four terms on the Scottsdale city council from 1992 to 2000. Although the election and office of the mayor of Scottsdale is nonpartisan, Manross is a registered Democrat. Manross was endorsed by both the Democratic governor Janet Napolitano and the Republican Senator John McCain, and the Scottsdale Area Chamber of Commerce as well as the Sierra Club. Prior to the challenge from Jim Lane, her party affiliation was not an impediment in the conservative, largely Republican city of Scottsdale.

As mayor, Manross was instrumental in leading the city council to approve workplace protections for LGBT employees.

State-mandated changes in the election calendar which moved the traditional spring city election to align with fall federal and state elections brought more partisan voters into play in the 2008 election. Republican Jim Lane was able to defeat Manross by less than 1/2 of 1 percent of the vote.

Election history

References

Living people
Mayors of places in Arizona
Politicians from Scottsdale, Arizona
University of California, Los Angeles alumni
Minot State University alumni
Women city councillors in Arizona
Arizona Democrats
Arizona city council members
Women mayors of places in Arizona
Year of birth missing (living people)
20th-century American politicians
20th-century American women politicians
21st-century American politicians
21st-century American women politicians